The A110 is a netbook computer by One. It is built on a reference design by Quanta Computer and was announced to run Linpus Linux. However, some or all of the first batch have actually been delivered with a modified Ubuntu Linux installed, using SquashFS to fit the system in the 2GB Flash memory.

Hardware specifications

 VIA C7-M-ULV Processor (1.0 GHz, 400-MHz FSB, max. 3.5 Watt)
 7-inch display 800×480 (with external VGA port)
 512 MB DDR2 PC400 RAM
 64 MB VX800 S3 integrated graphics card
 2 GB Flash Memory
 2× USB 2.0 ports
 1× Microphone-in jack
 1× Speaker jack
 56 kbit/s Modem
 10/100 Mbit/s LAN
 WLAN
 3-in-1 Cardreader, SD/MMC/MS
 Height: 2.8 cm
 Width: 24.3 cm
 Depth: 17.1 cm
 Weight: 950 g

A second model called A120 is available with 4 GB of flash memory  (compared to the 2 GB of the A110), a webcam and Windows XP.

References

External links

 One Official Site
 Official site

Subnotebooks
Linux-based devices
Netbooks